Hillside is a Northwest Portland neighborhood in the city's West Hills.  It is anchored by the Hillside Community Center, the former site of Catlin Gabel School, which was designed by noted architect Pietro Belluschi.  The center features neighborhood meeting spaces, a soccer field and a basketball court.  The neighborhood is adjacent to Northwest, which is home to many restaurants, bars and shops and to Forest Park.

Parks 

 Adams Community Garden - 4300 NW Cornell Rd.
 Adams Property - 4300 NW Cornell Rd. 
 Hillside Community Center - 635 NW Culpepper Terr.
 Hillside Park - 653 NW Culpepper Terr.
 Pittock Mansion - 3229 NW Pittock Dr.

Buildings
 The Westerly - 2351 NW Westover Rd.

References

External links 

 Hillside Street Tree Inventory Report

 
Neighborhoods in Portland, Oregon